The 1946 All-Ireland Senior Football Championship Final was the 59th All-Ireland Final and the deciding match of the 1946 All-Ireland Senior Football Championship, an inter-county Gaelic football tournament for the top teams in Ireland.

The game was originally set for 22 September, but was delayed for two weeks as part of the "Save the Harvest" campaign. (see: Winter of 1946–47)

Roscommon had a six-point lead with three minutes left, but Kerry made an amazing comeback with goals by Paddy Burke and Tom "Gega" O Connor. Burke and O'Connor also scored late goals in the replay.

It was the third of three All-Ireland football titles won by Kerry in the 1940s.

References

All-Ireland Senior Football Championship Final
All-Ireland Senior Football Championship Final, 1946
All-Ireland Senior Football Championship Final
All-Ireland Senior Football Championship Finals
Kerry county football team matches
Roscommon county football team matches